Chad Woollard (born September 18, 1979) is a Canadian former professional ice hockey Winger who last played for the Fort Worth Brahmas in the Central Hockey League (CHL). He previously played in the American Hockey League (AHL) with the Utah Grizzlies, St. John's Maple Leafs and the San Antonio Rampage.

Career statistics

Awards and honours

References

External links

1979 births
Canadian ice hockey forwards
Corpus Christi Icerays players
Fort Worth Brahmas players
Greensboro Generals players
Jackson Bandits players
Living people
Mississippi RiverKings (CHL) players
Muskegon Lumberjacks players
Owen Sound Platers players
Quad City Mallards (UHL) players
San Antonio Rampage players
Sault Ste. Marie Greyhounds players
St. John's Maple Leafs players
Toronto St. Michael's Majors players
Utah Grizzlies (AHL) players